Paolo Cirino Pomicino (born 3 September 1939) is an Italian politician, who was elected to the Chamber of Deputies in the 2006 Italian general election representing the Christian Democracy for the Autonomies.

Biography
Pomicino was born in Naples. He graduated in Medicine and Surgery and entered Christian Democracy for which he became first a member of Naples' city council, and then member of the Italian Chamber of Deputies in 1976, a position he held until 1994.

A member of Giulio Andreotti's current, he was under minister of the Public Functions  (1988-1989) and Minister of the Budget (1989-1992). He was nicknamed o' ministro ("The minister" in Neapolitan dialect). During his membership of DC, he has been convicted for illegal financing (sentenced to 1 year and 8 months) and he negotiated (thereby admitting guilt) 2 months for corruption and hidden funds. He was also involved in the scandal of the funds management for the reconstruction after the 1980 Irpinia earthquake.

Previously he was a Member of the European Parliament for the Southern region, elected on the UDEUR ticket. He sat on the European Parliament's Committee on Economic and Monetary Affairs, and was a member of the Delegation to the EU-Kazakhstan, EU-Kyrgyzstan and EU-Uzbekistan Parliamentary Cooperation Committees, and for relations with Tajikistan, Turkmenistan and Mongolia and a substitute for the Delegation for relations with the Maghreb countries and the Arab Maghreb Union (including Libya). His attendance to the European Parliament plenary sessions, however, ranks among the lowest, with a mere 44 presences between 2004 and 2006.

References

External links
 

1939 births
Living people
Politicians from Naples
Italian politicians convicted of corruption
Italian prisoners and detainees
Prisoners and detainees of Italy
Union of Democrats for Europe MEPs
MEPs for Italy 2004–2009
21st-century Italian politicians
Criminals from Naples